M. P. Salgado was the 40th Surveyor General of Sri Lanka. He was appointed in 1996, succeeding N. C. Seneviratne, and held the office until 1996. He was succeeded by K. L. A. Ranasinghe Silva.

References

S